Typhloesus wellsi is an extinct species of enigmatic bilaterian animals from the Bear Gulch Limestone. It was once thought to be the first body fossil of a conodont, based on what turned out to be its gut contents; it is now thought to exhibit a radula, which would make it a mollusc, although different types of animal have independently evolved radula-like features. Mark Purnell, of the Centre for Palaeobiology at the University of Leicester, said that it was not definitively known  "what this weird thing is".

Discovery 
Typhloesus was first described back in 1973 from Carboniferous rocks in Montana. The animal was then jokingly referred to as the ‘alien goldfish’ by subsequent studies. Because of its highly enigmatic nature, this organism was only mentioned briefly in several papers. It was then thought to have been the first known body fossil of a conodont, which are a primitive group of jawless agnathan fish distantly related to lampreys and hagfish. This was based on the presence of "conodont elements", which are the small comb-like teeth of those animals. The teeth however were actually located in the gut contents of the Typhloesus, meaning that while it wasn't a conodont, they were a part of its diet. The animals taxonomy would be shrouded in mystery for over 30 years until in September 2022, when a new paper published revealed several potential mollusk-like features of the animal.

Description 

It has a fusiform (spindle-shaped) body, with a maximum length of 90 mm. At the posterior or backside of the animal is a caudal fin, which was supported by two sets of orthogonal fin rays. The exterior lacks any other organs. The internal anatomy consists of a foregut and a midgut. The gut lacks a midsection and an anus. Beneath the midgut is a disc shaped organ, tentatively called a ferrodiscus; the purpose of this organ is unknown, however it has a high concentration of iron.

Paleoecology 
It might have been both a predator and a scavenger, as its fossils sometimes contains conodont teeth and worm teeth located in the midgut of the animal.

See also 
Tullimonstrum

References 

Enigmatic prehistoric animal genera
Controversial taxa